is a Japanese football manager and former player. He is the current Thailand U20 head coach.

Playing career
Miura was born in Kamaishi on July 16, 1963. After graduating from Komazawa University, he played for his local club Morioka Zebra and Nippon Steel Kamaishi.

Coaching career

Japan
In 1997, Miura became a coach for Brummell Sendai. In October, he managed the club at 1997 Emperor's Cup. In 1998, he signed with Mito HollyHock. From 2000 onwards, he managed J.League clubs Omiya Ardija (2000-2001, 2004–2006), Consadole Sapporo (2007-2008), Vissel Kobe (2009-2010), Ventforet Kofu (2011), and most recently, FC Gifu (2022).

Vietnam
On 10 May 2014, the Vietnam Football Federation appointed Miura as Vietnam national team manager after agreeing to a two-year contract. His first official competition was the 2014 AFF Suzuki Cup, in which he led the team to the semifinal when it was defeated by Malaysia.

On 31 March 2015, Miura became the first manager of Vietnam U-23 national team to qualify for the 2016 AFC U-23 Championship (Note that this is also only the 2nd edition of the tournament. It was held the 1st time in 2013 as AFC U-22 Championships) as the 3rd of the 5 best second-ranked teams in the qualification stage. Despite this early success, he started showing his limitations a year later with some disappointing performances against Thailand during the FIFA World Cup 2018 qualifications or Australia U23 and Jordan U23 during the AFC-U23 Championships. He has been then criticized by local coaches for being too conservative, suggesting that he continually asks his men to play tough, even against countries with players of superior physical shape and strength. His football style was therefore considered not suitable for small size Vietnamese players. There was a rumor that Miura was sacked because he refused to use some of the country's promising youths from the Hoang Anh Gia Lai-Arsenal-JMG Football Academy whose owner is also a vice president of the Vietnam Football Federation. However, there is no evidence backing this claim. In fact, it was more obvious that Miura's contract was prematurely terminated due to the poor results in the FIFA World Cup 2018 Qualification where Vietnam lost both games against their rival Thailand.

Managerial statistics

Honors
Omiya Ardija
 J2 League runner-up: 2004

Consadole Sapporo
 J2 League: 2007

Vietnam
 AFF Championship third place: 2014
 Southeast Asian Games bronze medal: 2015

References

External links

1963 births
Living people
Komazawa University alumni
Association football people from Iwate Prefecture
Japanese footballers
Japanese football managers
J1 League managers
J2 League managers
J3 League managers
Vegalta Sendai managers
Mito HollyHock managers
Omiya Ardija managers
Hokkaido Consadole Sapporo managers
Vissel Kobe managers
Ventforet Kofu managers
FC Gifu managers
Vietnam national football team managers
Expatriate football managers in Vietnam
Association footballers not categorized by position
Japanese expatriate football managers